Through Your Eyes: Kevin Kern Collection, or simply Through Your Eyes or Kevin Kern Collection, is a compilation album from American new-age pianist Kevin Kern, released in Japan only in 2002.

As with his preceding and succeeding albums, it is an album of instrumental songs. The compilation contains the two new compositions used in his worldwide compilation More Than Words, plus tracks from his five studio albums, some of which appeared in More Than Words.

Track listing

Personnel
 Kevin Kern – Piano, Keyboards, Producer
 Jeff Linsky – Guitar
 Terence Yallop – Executive Producer

External links
Kevin Kern's official website
Kevin Kern at Real Music
Through Your Eyes at Kevin Kern's official website
Through Your Eyes at HMV Japan

2002 greatest hits albums